State Highway 13 (SH 13) in the U.S. state of Colorado is a north–south mountain route that travels from Rifle to the Wyoming border near Baggs, Wyoming, through the Rocky Mountains.

Route description

The route begins at a diamond interchange with Interstate 70 south of Rifle. It then crosses the Colorado River and intersects U.S. Highway 6 at the south side of Rifle. Along the north side of town the road turns slightly northeastward as it passes through the northern Rifle and into grassland, where it intersects State Highway 325. As the road turns back northward and then slightly northwestward, the surrounding terrain turns into a more barren land dotted with occasional shrubs and grass. As the road continues northwestward, the shrubs and trees become more dense along hillsides. SH 13 then crosses into Rio Blanco County, when the direction becomes straight north. SH 13 then interchanges with State Highway 64, which meets its east end here, and turns abruptly eastward. SH 13 then becomes Market Street as it cuts through the south side of Meeker, paralleling the White River. Following an intersection with a local road leading to Meeker Airport, the road again turns northward back into rural Rio Grande County.

Following several miles of barren land north of Meeker, SH 13 exits the White River Valley and enters mountainous terrain. The road then follows the Good Springs Creek valley to the Moffat county line. SH 13 continues through rural Moffat County and gradually turns eastward and again northward after several miles. Near Hamilton, the route's next destination, the road meets State Highway 317 and turns slightly northwestward. After a distance winding through barren land, the road reaches Craig, where it meets U.S. Highway 40 and begins a short concurrency through the city. Following the overlap SH 13 again moves northward, out of town and along the Fortification Creek valley. Here fields, are located along the road, moving northwestward. Eventually, after moving along several miles of road through farmland, the road reaches the Wyoming state line. The road continues as Wyoming Highway 789 to Baggs.

History
The route was established in the 1920s and was paved by 1947. Minor changes corrected the route to its current routing today by 1985.

SH 13 was once cosigned as SH 789.

Major intersections

See also

References

External links

013
Transportation in Garfield County, Colorado
Transportation in Rio Blanco County, Colorado
Transportation in Moffat County, Colorado